David Crosby: Remember My Name is a 2019 documentary about the musician David Crosby.  It was directed by A.J. Eaton and produced by Cameron Crowe. The title is a play on the title of Crosby's 1971 album If I Could Only Remember My Name.

The film had its festival debut at the 2019 Sundance Film Festival.  It is distributed by Sony Pictures Classics.

Reception
From its premiere at Sundance and subsequent theatrical release, the film garnered very positive reviews. The website's critics consensus reads: "Refreshingly candid and disarmingly reflective, David Crosby: Remember My Name offers an absorbing look at its subject's life and career." Peter Travers at Rolling Stone called it "one of the best rock docs of all time." Owen Gleiberman at Variety called it "a moving and elegiac rock-nostalgia documentary and that "everything comes full circle, and to the millennials, David Crosby isn't just some boring old hippie — he's more like the Gandalf of Woodstock." Steve Pond of TheWrap wrote, "Think of it as the film version of the final albums made by Leonard Cohen and David Bowie, who made wrenching final statements that they likely knew would be their last."  
Jordan Ruimy of The Playlist opined, "Eaton and Crowe, no doubt working together closely, compose a beautiful hymnal. It's as if you're hearing a powerful and evocative spiritual of remorse sung right before your very ears and eyes."

Accolades
The film was nominated for a Grammy Award in the Best Music Film category for the 62nd Annual Grammy Awards.

References

External links
 

2019 films
2019 documentary films
American documentary films
David Crosby
Documentary films about men
Documentary films about singers
Sony Pictures Classics films
Vinyl Films films
2010s English-language films
2010s American films
English-language documentary films